Hypermodern Jazz 2000.5 (usually shortened to Hypermodern Jazz) is a studio album by German musician Alec Empire. It was released in 1996. It was Empire's fourth full-length solo album, his fourth release for the Mille Plateaux label, and the first of three albums he released in the same year. The Destroyer was released on DHR the following June and Les Étoiles des Filles Mortes, also for Mille Plateaux, in November.

As its title suggests, the record exhibits an experimental approach to jazz, utilising electronics and synthesizers.

Track listing

References

External links
 
 Hypermodern Jazz 2000.5 on Bandcamp
 Official Alec Empire fansite

Alec Empire albums
1996 albums